Riama columbiana, the Colombian lightbulb lizard, is a species of lizard in the family Gymnophthalmidae. It is endemic to Colombia.

References

Riama
Reptiles of Colombia
Endemic fauna of Colombia
Reptiles described in 1914
Taxa named by Lars Gabriel Andersson